The European PhD Program in Computational Logic (EPCL) was a three-year
distributed and structured doctorate program that started in fall 2011.
It was run by four European partner universities that have a long research
track in computational logic and also run the
European Master's Program in Computational Logic (EMCL) since 2004:

 Technische Universität Dresden, Germany (coordinating university)
 Free University of Bozen-Bolzano, Italy
 Universidade Nova de Lisboa, Portugal
 Technische Universität Wien, Austria

Doctoral candidates chose two of these partner universities and a third
associated non-European partner research organization (Simon
Fraser University, Universidad de Chile,
NICTA) or an industrial partner of the program
(IBM Italia, Lixto Software GmbH, Ontoprise GmbH).
The program involved stays at these three institutions, which were also
involved in supervision of the PhD project.

Graduates of EPCL received a joint degree of the two selected partner
universities which subsumes two acknowledged national doctoral
degrees of the respective universities' countries.

EPCL was supported by the 
German Academic Exchange Service (DAAD).

See also 

European Master Program in Computational Logic

References

External links
 European PhD Program in Computational Logic homepage 
 European Master's Program in Computational Logic homepage of EMCL 

College and university associations and consortia in Europe
Computer science education
Study abroad programs